Alexander's Feast may refer to:

 Alexander's Feast (Dryden)
 Alexander's Feast (Handel)